The Guadalquivir River watermills are located in Córdoba, Spain. On 30 June 2009, they were declared an Andalusian Historical Heritage site. Situated in the historic centre, these mills are vestiges emblematic of medieval buildings with varying degrees of damage. Some have been restored and used for cultural and tourism purposes as Molino de la Alegría which houses the Museum of Paleobotany within the Royal Botanic Garden of Córdoba. The names of these eleven mills are Albolafia, Alegría, Carbonell, Casillas, Emmedio, Lope García, Martos, Pápalo Tierno, San Antonio, San Lorenzo, and San Rafael.

Gallery

References

Guadalquivir
Historic centre of Córdoba, Spain
Buildings and structures in Córdoba, Spain
Guadalquivir